The 2024 Men's European Water Polo Championship will be the 36th running of the tournament. It will be held in Tel Aviv, Israel in October 2023, just 13 months after the previous ECH in Split, because the World Championships in Doha will be held already in the winter of 2024. The summer of 2024 is reserved for the Olympic Games.

Qualification

Sixteen teams will be able to compete at the main event. They are broken up as follows:

 The host nation
 The top seven teams from the 2022 European Championship not already qualified as host nation
 Final eight from the qualifiers.

References

Men
Men's European Water Polo Championship
International sports competitions hosted by Israel
Men's European Water Polo Championship
European Water Polo Championship
European Water Polo Championship